André Kuper (born 14 December 1960) is a German politician from the Christian Democratic Union. Between 1997 and 2012 he was mayor of the city of Rietberg. Since then he has been a member of the Landtag of North Rhine-Westphalia. Kuper was elected president of the State Parliament on 1 June 2017.

References 

Living people
1960 births
20th-century German politicians
21st-century German politicians
Mayors of Rietberg
Christian Democratic Union of Germany politicians
Members of the Order of Merit of North Rhine-Westphalia
Members of the Landtag of North Rhine-Westphalia